Plava may refer to:

 Plava (Russia), a tributary of the Upa river in Tula Oblast, Russia
 Plava River (Kosovo), a river flowing through Dragash, Kosovo, and parts of Albania
 Plav, Montenegro, a town in Montenegro, known as Plava in Albanian and some English sources